Gil Hak-mi (born February 18, 1989) is South Korean singer finishing third in first season of Superstar K. She sings the theme of reality-variety show 2 Days & 1 Night with Han Bora. She is also featured as vocalist on songs of Bobby Kim and Double K.

Discography

Extended plays

Singles

Soundtrack appearances

References 

Superstar K participants
1989 births
South Korean female idols
Living people
21st-century South Korean women singers